Iain McKee is an English actor best known for his role as Frank Gadney in BBC1 drama series Lilies and Michael in BBC sitcom The Visit. He is originally from Bolton and now lives in North London.

Filmography
 2001 - The Parole Officer - Second Policeman
 2001 - The Bunker - Private
 2004 - The Banker - Nervous Man
 2008 - Me and Orson Welles - Vahktangov

Television
 2002 - Is Harry on the Boat? - Baz (2 episodes)
 2002 - Burn It - Paul (8 episodes)
 2003 - Burn It 2 - Paul (10 episodes)
 2004 - The Bill - Joe Best (2 episodes)
 2004 - Conviction - Terry Waters
 2005 - Legless - Paul
 2005 - Dead Man Weds - Duane Guffog (6 episodes)
 2005 - Shameless - Graham (1 episode)
 2006 - The Somme – From Defeat to Victory - Pvt. Fiddes
 2007 - Lilies - Frank Gadney (7 Episodes)
 2007 - Housewife 49 - Tom
 2007 - The Visit - Michael
 2008 - Wired - Nick
 2009 - Ideal - Jamie
 2009 - The Life and Death of a Mobile Phone - Narrator/Phone
 2011 - The Promise - Sergeant Hugh Robbins
 2012 - Titanic (Episode four) - Seaman Scott
 2012 - Sinbad (Episode 3: "House of Games") - Faris/Essam
 2012 - Mrs Biggs - Charlie Wilson
 2014 - Castles in the Sky

Video games
 2013 - Ni no Kuni - Marcassin

External links

Year of birth missing (living people)
Living people
Actors from Bolton
English male film actors
Place of birth missing (living people)
English male television actors